Richard Jay Grennberg (June 13, 1902 – September 22, 1978) was an American water polo player. He competed in the men's tournament at the 1928 Summer Olympics.

References

External links
 

1902 births
1978 deaths
American male water polo players
Olympic water polo players of the United States
Water polo players at the 1928 Summer Olympics
Water polo players from Chicago